Anne Veenendaal (born 7 September 1995) is a Dutch field hockey player for the Dutch national team.

Veenendaal made her debut for the Netherlands national team on the 22nd of August 2015, at the age of nineteen, in a match against Poland during the 2015 European Championship in London. With the Dutch team she won gold at the  2017 European Championship, and the 2018 World Cup. She is openly lesbian.

References

1995 births
Living people
Dutch female field hockey players
Female field hockey goalkeepers
Amsterdamsche Hockey & Bandy Club players
Dutch LGBT sportspeople
21st-century Dutch LGBT people